Johan Hye-Knudsen (24 May 1896 in Nyborg – 28 September 1975) was a Danish conductor.

1896 births
1975 deaths
Danish conductors (music)
Male conductors (music)
20th-century conductors (music)
20th-century Danish male musicians
People from Nyborg